The Order of Saint Paul the First Hermit (abbreviated OSPPE), commonly called the Pauline Fathers, is a monastic order of the Roman Catholic Church founded in Hungary during the 13th century.

This name is derived from the hermit Saint Paul of Thebes (died  345), canonized in 491 by Pope Gelasius I. After his death, the Monastery of Saint Paul the Anchorite was founded and still exists today, taking him as its model.

History
The Order was formed in 1250 by the Blessed Eusebius of Esztergom of two communities: one founded at  around 1225 by Bishop Bartholomew of Pécs, who had united the scattered hermits of his diocese, and the other consisting of his own followers. In 1246, Blessed Eusebius, Canon of the Cathedral of Esztergom, resigned his dignities, distributed his goods among the poor and withdrew to the solitude of the Pilis mountains, near Zante (probably related to present day ) to lead a life of penance with a few companions (see the ruins of the Holy Cross Monastery at present-day ).

In the same year, Eusebius proposed and obtained affiliation with the  community under the rule prescribed by its founder and was chosen superior. He received the approbation of Ladislaus, Bishop of Pécs, for the new Order, but the publication of the decrees of the Fourth Lateran Council at this time necessitated a journey to Rome to secure final authorization by the Holy See.

The Order was accorded many privileges by succeeding pontiffs, among others that of exemption from episcopal jurisdiction, and provisions were made for the pursuit of higher studies in many of the monasteries, one papal regulation ordaining that no member could be raised to any dignity in the Order without the degree of Doctor of Divinity, for which a rigid examination was prescribed.

László Báthory translated the Bible into Hungarian circa 1456, but no contemporary copies have survived. However, the 16th century  is most likely a copy of Báthory's work in the 15th century.

The Pauline Order spread rapidly through Hungary, where alone it soon numbered 170 houses, and it attained an equal degree of prosperity in other countries, being divided into five flourishing provinces: Hungary (including Croatia, especially Istria), Germany, Poland, Sweden. In 1381, the body of St. Paul, the patron saint of the order, was transferred from Venice to the Monastery of St. Lawrence at Buda, which thereby gained greatly in prestige. Among the other famous houses of the congregation are the historical Polish Monastery of Our Lady of Jasna Góra (Our Lady of Bright Mountain) in Częstochowa, Poland, with its Miraculous Icon of the Black Madonna of Częstochowa (according to legend the work of St. Luke and discovered by St. Helena with the True Cross), and the monasteries at Pozsony (now Bratislava) and Wiener Neustadt near Vienna. The church of San Stefano Rotondo at Rome was attached to the Hungarian College by Gregory XIII.

In 1783, a number of houses in Bohemia, Austria proper, Styria, etc., were suppressed, and political disturbances in Hungary brought the same fate to most of the Hungarian monasteries which had rendered incalculable services to religion and education. The destruction of the annals of these houses left the historical sources very meager. There remained a handful of houses of the order in Poland. At the beginning of the 20th century, only two Pauline monasteries remained.

The habit was originally brown but, in about 1341, white was adopted with a white belt or cincture and, over the white tunic, a white scapular with a hood. In choir or more commonly in liturgical events, a white mantle is worn by monks in perpetual profession. The Order is also known for its privilege of wearing a white zucchetto, although many monks choose not to wear them. Monks also may make use of a black cloak either to protect their habit from the elements or to keep warm in winter. Like all religious who wear white habits, white socks ought to be worn with the habit of the order.

Blessed Eusebius of Esztergom

Eusebius was born in Esztergom in the Kingdom of Hungary around 1200. He came from a wealthy, well to do family. He received his ordination in the cathedral in Esztergom as a Canon Regular of Saint Augustine. In 1216, he received permission from the bishop to leave the cathedral and he began a hermitage in Pilis. In 1246, more of his brother canons and other hermits along the river Danube lived with him near Pilisszántó.

Around 1250, he founded the first real Pauline community at the monastery of the Holy Cross where they adopted the hermits rule from the monastery of St. James in Patach (founded in 1225 by Bishop Bartholomew of Pécs). In 1256, he was elected the first Provincial of the Order. In 1262, he asked Pope Urban IV for approval of the religious community and they were given temporary approval. On , Cardinal Gentile Portino da Montefiore, as a legate of Pope Clement V, traveled from Rome to Hungary to grant the approval and, on this day, he also bestowed the rule of Saint Augustine on behalf of the Holy See. A year later, the first monastic constitutions were approved.

He was interred in the Monastery crypt. During the 150 years of Turkish occupation in Hungary, the Church and Monastery of the Holy Cross, including his tomb, was destroyed.

On , the Congregation for Divine Worship and the Discipline of the Sacraments, in approving the new liturgical calendar of the Pauline Order, authorized the inclusion of the 20 January as the feast of Bl. Eusebius of Esztergom. It is noteworthy to mention that due to the close relation between the Hungarian people and the Order of Saint Paul the First Hermit, Blessed Eusebius was always referred to by the people as Blessed, from soon after his death to this very day.

Coat of arms
The Pauline coat of arms contains within it the symbols listed by St. Jerome, according to pious tradition, which are associated with the last moments of St. Paul of Thebes' life.

The Order today

Charism of the order today
The essence of the Pauline Fathers are:
 Contemplation of God in solitude
 The love of liturgical prayer
 A poor and industrious life
 To spread devotion to Our Lady and the imitation of her virtues, by running shrines in her honor
 Apostolic activity, especially preaching the Word of God and the administration of the sacraments.

Pauline formation
To become a religious, it is necessary to undergo an initial period of testing as a religious brother; hence, the novitiate. This time is used to isolate a candidate for the seminary or religious life from personal and telephone contact with family and existing friends. The novice can write letters that are subjected to censorship. During the novitiate, the novices meet with their family only twice: for the clothing in the habit and on making first profession. During the novitiate, every Friday is a day during which novices are not allowed to speak with each other. During their stay in the novitiate, brothers work in the monastery farm; they work in the field at digging potatoes and with the breeding and maintenance of the pigs. They also do work in the monastery flower-vegetable garden. The entire period spent in the novitiate is to knead the novice, to show their convictions and stability to make the decision to become a monk. It is also the period during which the older monks will need to assess the novice's suitability for life in a group such as the Order.

The Order generally accepts any men who have completed high school onwards. Those who are called to Holy Orders will undergo the following type of formation:
 The Postulancy: (if possible) in a Parish or Monastery belonging to the order.
 The Seminary: returning to  after the novitiate, the seminarian will undergo two years of philosophy and four years of study of theology in Kraków. After the studies are completed, the seminarians profess solemn vows and are ordained first to the diaconate and then to the priesthood.

Men with no secondary education or who feel the call to the religious life but not to the priesthood and who wish to live in community can be religious brothers for life. To do this, they must go through the following stages of training:
 Two years juniorate at a facility designated by superiors, followed by perpetual vows.

It is noteworthy to mention that this is the general scheme for all wishing to enter the Order of Saint Paul the First Hermit in Poland where the majority of the Order is today. Other countries offering formation are Hungary and Cameroon. Some candidates are sent to Rome to either complete or commence their studies; this being said, Poland is where most of the formation is carried out.

The Australian province of the Order has a different vocational program.
Normally a potential member is in regular communication with the Order and visits the monasteries of the Order frequently. At this informal stage, the potential member is called a candidate to the Order. After some discernment and maturation of the vocation, the candidate petitions to be admitted to the Order.

 The Postulancy: At Penrose Park monastery. This may last until the postulant is ready to be sent to Poland for Novitiate. Postulants seeking to be lay brothers may remain in Australia for their novitiate as well.
At the investiture of the habit, the novice may petition to receive a new religious name, which he himself may propose. The novice is strongly encouraged to learn some Polish during the novitiate.
 The Seminary formation: All Australian seminarians are sent to Rome, where they live at the Monastery and Parish at Prima Porta. During this time they study two years of philosophy and three years of theology at the Angelicum. These studies may be done in English or in Italian which they are strongly encouraged to learn.
 Pastoral experience: Every second summer the seminarian returns to Australia, both to spend time with his family and to undertake pastoral experience in the various monasteries and houses of the Australian Province. After he has finished his studies in Rome and obtained a Bachelor of Sacred Theology degree (STB), the seminarian returns to Australia and professes solemn vows. After solemn profession he is ordained a deacon and then finally a priest.

General administration of the Order

The rule
The Order has its own constitution and directory. They adhere to the Rule of St. Augustine. which was given to them in the year 1308. The Order is classified as a monastic order but is organised like a mendicant one. Paulines are monks not friars. Through the passage of time the Order has had to take on more and more pastoral work, even the running of parishes, but it is still a monastic order at heart.

Definitorium
During the Chapter General Elections held on 4–5 March 2020, the following Fathers were elected to positions within the Order:
 Father General of the OrderFr. Arnold Chrapkowski, OSPPE
 Vicar General of the Order (I Definitor)Fr. Michał Lukoszek, OSPPE
 II DefinitorFr. Ryszard Dec, OSPPE
 III DefinitorFr. Piotr Łoza, OSPPE
 IV DefinitorFr. Bernard Kluczkowski, OSPPE
 General Procurator of the Order to the Holy SeeFr. Bazyli Degórski, OSPPE
 Administrator General of the OrderFr. Marek Moga, OSPPE
 Secretary General of the OrderFr. Paweł Przygodzki, OSPPE

The term of office in the Definitorium lasts six years.

Distribution of the Order

There were 493 monks including 50 at various levels of formation and 3 bishops.

The Province of Germany was founded in 2002. As of 2020, the Provincial there is Fr. Benjamin Bąkowski.
The American Province was founded in 2008. As of April 2022, it is led by provincial Fr. Tadeusz Lizinczyk.

The Province of Australia was founded in 2008. The current provincial is Fr. Albert Wasniowski. The province consists of two monasteries and four parishes with 1 bishop, 11 priests, three lay brothers, and four seminarians.

There are also the Quasi-Province of Hungary and the Quasi-Province of Croatia.

References

External links

 
 
 
 
 
 

1250 establishments in Europe
Christian religious orders established in the 13th century
 
Religious organizations established in the 1250s